Danquah is a surname. Notable people with the surname include:

Frank Wiafe Danquah (born 1989), Dutch footballer
J. B. Danquah (1895–1965), Ghanaian politician, scholar and historian
Joseph Boateng Danquah (born 1947), Ghanaian general
Kwasi Danquah III (born 1986), Ghanaian musician, better known by his stage name Tinchy Stryder
Michael Ebo Danquah, Ghanaian boxer of the 1980s and '90s
Meri Nana-Ama Danquah (born 1967), Ghanaian-American writer, editor, journalist and public speaker
Paul Danquah (born 1925), British actor and lawyer
Woyiram Boakye-Danquah (1942–2007), Ghanaian politician and social worker
Mabel Dove Danquah, Ghanaian journalist and political activist
Melody Millicent Danquah, Ghana female pilot
Eric Yirenkyi Danquah, Ghana plant geneticist.
J. B. Danquah-Adu, Ghanaian Politician

Surnames of Akan origin